Denis Coulthard Graham FRSE FRSC FIB FRSA (December 1929-12 October 2002) was a British biological chemist. He specialised in plant diseases and their treatment.

Biography
Denis Coulthard Graham was born in Carlisle in December 1929.

He went to Durham University, graduating with a BSc. He then undertook postgraduate studies at the University of Edinburgh gaining a doctorate (PhD).

He became Director of Agricultural Scientific Services in the Department of Agriculture and Fisheries within the Scottish Office. The University of Edinburgh granted him a second, honorary doctorate (DSc) while in this role.

He died in Edinburgh on 12 October 2002.

Recognition
In 1975 he was elected a Fellow of the Royal Society of Edinburgh. His proposers included Mary Noble.

Personal life
In 1968 he married Elizabeth (Betty) Fraser, a New Zealander. They had no children. From the 1970s he lived in Caiystone Gardens in southern Edinburgh.

Publications

Chemical Control of Certain Fungal Diseases of Potato Tubers (1982)

References

1929 births
2002 deaths
People from Carlisle, Cumbria
British biochemists
Alumni of Durham University
Fellows of the Royal Society of Edinburgh
20th-century non-fiction writers